Concord Township is one of the ten townships of Fayette County, Ohio, United States. As of the 2010 census the population was 901, down from 1,068 at the 2000 census.

Geography
Located in the southwestern part of the county, it borders the following townships:
Jasper Township - north
Union Township - northeast
Perry Township - southeast
Green Township - south
Wayne Township, Clinton County - southwest
Richland Township, Clinton County - northwest

No municipalities are located in Concord Township.

Name and history
It is one of seven Concord Townships statewide.

Government
The township is governed by a three-member board of trustees, who are elected in November of odd-numbered years to a four-year term beginning on the following January 1. Two are elected in the year after the presidential election and one is elected in the year before it. There is also an elected township fiscal officer, who serves a four-year term beginning on April 1 of the year after the election, which is held in November of the year before the presidential election. Vacancies in the fiscal officership or on the board of trustees are filled by the remaining trustees.

References

External links
County website

Townships in Fayette County, Ohio
Townships in Ohio